The history of the Jewish people in Chișinău dates to at the early 1700s, when Chișinău was located first in Moldavia and later from 1812 onwards in the Bessarabia region of the Russian Empire. Chișinău is now the capital city of Moldova. Chișinău is the center of the Jewish population of Moldova. As of 2022, around 10,000 of the 15,000 Moldovan Jews reside in Chișinău.

History
Chișinău (Keshenev in Yiddish) was historically part of Moldavia. In 1812, the region was annexed by the Russian Empire and became known as Bessarabia. The earliest Jewish presence in Chișinău dates back to the early 18th century. By 1774, Jewish people were 7% of the total population of Chișinău. In 1774, a Jewish burial society was founded in the city with 144 members.

Kishinev pogrom

Post-Soviet era
Since 1991, following the collapse of the Soviet Union, many Moldovan Jews have made aliyah to Israel or have emigrated to Western countries such as the United States. The population of Moldovan Jews is disproportionately elderly, with between a quarter to half of the community being elders.

Chabad maintains a synagogue in Chișinău. Agudath Israel operates the Torat Emet yeshiva.

In 2022, Ukrainian-Jewish refugees found refuge in Chișinău's four main synagogues, including the Sinagoga Sticlarilor (Glassmakers’ Synagogue).

Notable Jewish people from Chișinău
Olga Bancic, a Romanian communist activist known for her role in the French Resistance.
Abraham Baratz, a Romanian–French chess master.
Isaac B. Bersuker, a Soviet-Moldоvan-American theoretical physicist and quantum chemist.
Alexandr Bilinkis, a Moldovan businessman, public and diplomatic figure, and philanthropist.
Samuel Bronston, a Bessarabian-born American film producer, film director, and a nephew of Leon Trotsky.
Isaak Bubis, a Moldovan Soviet engineer and architect.
Marc Chirik, a communist revolutionary who co-founded the International Communist Current.
Yitzhak Coren, an Israeli politician who served as a member of the Knesset for Mapai and the Alignment.
William F. Friedman, a US Army cryptographer who ran the research division of the Army's Signal Intelligence Service (SIS) in the 1930s.
Alexander Frumkin, a Russian/Soviet electrochemist.
Dennis Gaitsgory, a professor of mathematics at Harvard University.
Marat Gelman, a Russian collector, gallerist, and an op-ed columnist.
Jeff Gitelman, a Grammy-nominated record producer, musician and songwriter.
Izso Glickstein, a naturalized American cantor (hazzan).
Alexander Goldenweiser (composer), a Soviet and Russian pianist, teacher and composer.
Sarah Gorby, a French contralto singer.
Julius Isserlis, a Russian pianist and composer.
Eliahu Itzkovitz, a Moldovan/Romanian-born Israeli assassin.
Ira Jan, a painter and writer.
Joseph Joanovici, a French Jewish merchant of scrap metal who supplied both Nazi Germany and the French Resistance.
Katia Kapovich, a Russian poet now living in the United States.
Boris Katz, an American research scientist.
Abe Katzman, a Klezmer violinist, bandleader, composer, and Brunswick Records recording artist.
David Kaushansky, a Soviet lawyer.
David Kessler (actor),  a prominent actor in the first great era of Yiddish theater.
Nathaniel Kleitman, a Bessarabian-born American physiologist and sleep researcher.
Jacob Knaani, a Moldavian born, later Israeli, lexicographer.
Gary Koshnitsky, a Bessarabian-born Australian chess master.
Jacob M. Landau, a Professor Emeritus in the Department of Political Science at the Hebrew University of Jerusalem.
Boris Leskin, a Soviet and American film and theater actor.
Avigdor Lieberman, a Soviet-born Israeli politician.
Haia Lifșiț, 
Moissaye Marans, a Bessarabian-born American sculptor.
Shmuel Merlin, a Revisionist Zionist activist, Irgun member and Israeli politician.
Grégoire Michonze, a Bessarabian-born Russian-French painter.
Lewis Milestone, a Russian-American film director.
Sacha Moldovan, a Russian-born American expressionist and post-impressionist painter.
Ilya Oleynikov, a Russian comic actor and television personality.
Nina Pekerman, an Israeli athlete who competes in triathlon and Ironman Triathlon competitions.
Mendel Portugali, one of the leading figures in the Second Aliyah and a founder of the Hashomer movement.
Oleg Reidman, a Moldovan politician serving in the Parliament of the Republic of Moldova.
Boris Rosenthal, a character actor and operetta lyricist in the Yiddish theater.
Joe Rosenthal (sculptor), a Romanian-born Canadian sculptor.
Itzhak Shum, a retired Israeli football player and manager.
Abner Tannenbaum, a Russian-born Jewish-American Yiddish writer and journalist.
Zlata Tkach, a Moldovan composer and music educator.
Svetlana Toma, a Soviet actress.
Marina Tauber, a Member of the Parliament of the Republic of Moldova.
Anna Tumarkin, a Russian-born Swiss academic and first woman professor of philosophy at the University of Bern.
Alexander Ulanovsky, a chief illegal "rezident" for Soviet Military Intelligence (GRU) in the USA.
Abram Vaysbeyn, a Romanian-born Soviet and Moldovan architect.
Dina Vierny, an artists' model who became a singer, French art dealer, collector and museum director.
Zev Vilnay, an Israeli geographer, author and lecturer.
Maria Winetzkaja, an American mezzo-soprano opera singer.
Iona Yakir, a Red Army commander.
Avraham Yaski, an Israeli architect.
Chaim Yassky, a physician and medical administrator in Jerusalem.
Mark Zeltser, a Soviet-born American pianist.
Sam Zemurray, an American businessman who made his fortune in the banana trade.

See also
History of the Jewish people in Bessarabia
History of the Jewish people in Moldova
History of the Jewish people in Romania

References

Chișinău
Jewish Moldovan history
Jewish Russian and Soviet history